Wetzel's climbing mouse (Rhipidomys wetzeli) is a species of rodent in the family Cricetidae.
It is endemic to Venezuela.

References

 Baillie, J. 1996.  Rhipidomys wetzeli.   2006 IUCN Red List of Threatened Species.   Downloaded on 20 July 2007.
Musser, G. G. and M. D. Carleton. 2005. Superfamily Muroidea. pp. 894–1531 in Mammal Species of the World a Taxonomic and Geographic Reference. D. E. Wilson and D. M. Reeder eds. Johns Hopkins University Press, Baltimore.

Rhipidomys
Mammals described in 1989
Taxonomy articles created by Polbot
Endemic fauna of Venezuela